Brendan McKeown (born 18 March 1944) is a former British cyclist.

Cycling career
He competed in the 1000m time trial at the 1968 Summer Olympics.
British Amateur Individual Pursuit Champion 1967 and 1968.

He represented England in the 4,000 metres individual pursuit, at the 1966 British Empire and Commonwealth Games in Kingston, Jamaica.

References

1944 births
Living people
British male cyclists
Olympic cyclists of Great Britain
Cyclists at the 1968 Summer Olympics
Sportspeople from Welwyn Garden City
Cyclists at the 1966 British Empire and Commonwealth Games
Commonwealth Games competitors for England